The Rose Hill Methodist Episcopal Church is a historic building located in Rose Hill, Iowa, United States. The frame building was built in 1879 in the Gothic Revival style.  It is the only 19th-century church building that remains in its original location in the town.  The pointed arch windows are all at 45 degree angles, demonstrating the limited carpentry experience of the church members who built the structure.    It was listed on the National Register of Historic Places in 2003.

References

Churches completed in 1879
Churches in Mahaska County, Iowa
Churches on the National Register of Historic Places in Iowa
National Register of Historic Places in Mahaska County, Iowa
Gothic Revival church buildings in Iowa
Former Methodist church buildings in Iowa